The Atlanta Braves are a Major League Baseball (MLB) franchise based in Atlanta, Georgia. They play in the National League East division. Officially known as the "First-Year Player Draft", the Rule 4 Draft is MLB's primary mechanism for assigning players from high schools, colleges, and other amateur clubs to its franchises. The draft order is determined based on the previous season's standings, with the team possessing the worst record receiving the first pick. In addition, teams which lost free agents in the previous off-season may be awarded compensatory or supplementary picks. Since the establishment of the draft in 1965, the Braves have selected 56 players in the first round.

Of those 56 players, 27 have been pitchers, the most of any position; 15 of these were right-handed, while 12 were left-handed. The Braves have also selected eight outfielders, seven shortstops, five catchers, four third basemen, three first basemen, and two second basemen in the initial round of the draft. The franchise has drafted nine players from colleges or high schools in the state of Florida, more than any other state. Eight more selections have come from their home state of Georgia. Two selections have come from outside the 50 United States: Luis Atilano (2003) is from the Commonwealth of Puerto Rico, and Scott Thorman (2000) is from Ontario, Canada.

Four of these players have won a World Series championship with the Braves—Kent Mercker, Steve Avery, Chipper Jones, and Mike Kelly—all as part of the 1995 championship team.  The team's 1974 selection, Dale Murphy, won consecutive National League Most Valuable Player Awards (NL MVP) in 1982 and 1983, the Lou Gehrig Memorial Award in 1985, and the Roberto Clemente Award in 1988. Bob Horner, the Braves' 1978 selection, won the National League Rookie of the Year Award in the same year.  Chipper Jones, drafted by the Braves in 1990, won the NL MVP Award in 1999.  The Braves have held the first overall pick twice; in 1978 they used it to select Horner, and in 1990 they chose Chipper Jones.

Atlanta has made 13 selections in the supplemental round of the draft.  They have also received three compensatory picks since the first draft in 1965. These additional picks are provided when a team loses a particularly valuable free agent in the previous off-season, or, more recently, if a team fails to sign a draft pick from the previous year.  The Braves failed to sign 1995 selection Chad Hutchinson, for which they received the 35th overall pick in the 1996 draft, which they used to draft Jason Marquis.

Key

Picks

Footnotes
 Through the 2012 season, free agents were evaluated by the Elias Sports Bureau and rated "Type A", "Type B", or not compensation-eligible. If a team offers arbitration to a player but that player refuses and subsequently signs with another team, the original team may receive additional draft picks. If a "Type A" free agent leaves in this way his previous team receives a supplemental pick and a compensation pick from the team with which he signs. If a "Type B" free agent leaves in this way his previous team receives only a supplemental pick. Since the 2013 draft, free agents are no longer classified by type; instead, compensatory picks are only awarded if the team offered its free agent a contract worth at least the average of the 125 current richest MLB contracts. However, if the free agent's last team acquired the player in a trade during the last year of his contract, it is ineligible to receive compensatory picks for that player.
 The Braves gained a compensatory first-round pick in 1980 from the Montreal Expos for losing free agent Rowland Office.
 The Braves lost their first-round pick in 1983 to the New York Mets as compensation for signing free agent Pete Falcone.
 The Braves lost their first-round pick in 1993 to the Chicago Cubs as compensation for signing free agent Greg Maddux.
 The Braves gained a supplemental first-round pick in 1996 for failing to sign 1995 first-round pick Chad Hutchinson.
  The Braves lost their first-round pick in 1998 to the Colorado Rockies as compensation for signing free agent Andrés Galarraga.
  The Braves lost their first-round pick in 1999 to the St. Louis Cardinals as compensation for signing free agent Brian Jordan.
 The Braves gained a compensatory and a supplemental first-round pick in 2000 for losing free-agent Russ Springer to the Arizona Diamondbacks.
 The Braves gained a supplemental first-round pick in 2000 for losing free agent José Hernández.
 The Braves gained a compensatory and a supplemental first-round pick in 2001 for losing free-agent Andy Ashby to the Los Angeles Dodgers.
 The Braves gained a supplemental first-round pick in 2002 for losing free agent Steve Karsay.
 The Braves lost their original first-round pick in 2003 to the Kansas City Royals as compensation for signing free agent Paul Byrd. They gained a supplemental first-round pick for losing free agent Tom Glavine.
 The Braves gained a supplemental first-round pick in 2003 for losing free agent Mike Remlinger.
 The Braves lost their first-round pick in 2004 to the Texas Rangers as compensation for signing free agent John Thomson.
 The Braves gained a supplemental first-round pick in 2005 for losing free agent Jaret Wright.
 The Braves gained a supplemental first-round pick in 2006 for losing free agent Kyle Farnsworth.
 The Braves gained a supplemental first-round pick in 2006 for losing free agent Rafael Furcal.
 The Braves gained a supplemental first-round pick in 2007 for losing free agent Danys Báez.
 The Braves lost their original first-round pick in 2008 to the New York Mets as compensation for signing free agent Tom Glavine. They gained a supplemental first-round pick for losing free agent Ron Mahay.
 The Braves lost their original first-round pick in 2010 to the Boston Red Sox as compensation for signing free agent Billy Wagner. They gained a supplemental first-round pick for losing free agent Michael Gonzalez.
 The Braves lost their original first-round pick in 2013 to the Tampa Bay Rays as compensation for signing free agent B.J. Upton. They gained a supplemental first-round pick for losing free agent Michael Bourn.
 The Braves lost their original first-round pick in 2014 to the Los Angeles Angels as compensation for signing free agent Ervin Santana. They gained a supplemental first-round pick for losing free agent Brian McCann.
 The Braves acquired the 41st pick from the San Diego Padres along with Carlos Quentin, Cameron Maybin, Matt Wisler, and Jordan Paroubeck in exchange for Craig Kimbrel and Melvin Upton, Jr.
 The Braves acquired the 40th pick from the Miami Marlins in a three-team trade. The Braves also traded Bronson Arroyo, Luis Avilán, Jim Johnson, José Peraza, and Alex Wood to the Los Angeles Dodgers for Héctor Olivera, Paco Rodriguez, and Zach Bird. The Marlins traded Mat Latos and Michael Morse to the Dodgers for Victor Araujo, Jeff Brigham, and Kevin Guzman.

References
General references

"Atlanta Braves First Round Picks with Signing Bonuses". Fueled by Sports. Retrieved July 4, 2016.
In-text citations

Atlanta Braves
Draft picks